The Polish-language surname Wójtowicz  or Wojtowicz may refer to:

House of Wojtowicz
John Wojtowicz (1945-2006), American bankrobber 
Tomasz Wójtowicz (born 1953), Polish volleyball player
Rudolf Wojtowicz (born 1956), Polish football player
Agnieszka Wojtowicz-Vosloo (born 1975), Polish-American filmmaker 
Douglas Wojtowicz

See also
Wojtkiewicz

Polish-language surnames